Salesian College Preparatory (formerly Salesian High School and Salesian House of Studies) is a private, Roman Catholic, co-educational, college-preparatory high school in Richmond, California, United States. Established in 1927, it is part of the Salesians of Don Bosco and is located in the Roman Catholic Diocese of Oakland.

It has rivalries with St. Patrick-St. Vincent High School and Saint Mary's College High School.

History 
The Salesian House of Studies opened on the campus as a seminary for future Salesians. In 1960, the school became Salesian High School and began allowing boys of west Contra Costa County to attend.

In 2006, the school changed its mascot from the Chieftain to the Pride, amid nationwide controversy over the use of Native American related mascots in athletics. 
In 2013, the school began using iPads instead of textbooks for some classwork.

In 2014, on the 50th anniversary of its first graduating class, the school changed its name to Salesian College Preparatory. It was also named the "best faith-based high school" by Parents' Press magazine.

Charitable works 
Since 1991, the school has held an annual golf tournament fundraiser at the Richmond Country Club to support disadvantaged students.

In 2015, the school raised funds to help Middletown High School after the town was devastated by the Valley Fire. Salesian also received an anonymous $250,000 donation to update the science lab for STEM studies.

Sexual abuse 
As part of a larger sexual abuse scandal in the Salesian order in 2006, two instances of sexual abuse occurring between 1969 and 1979 at Salesian High School (now Salesian College Preparatory) resulted in a large settlement for one victim and a jury award to another. In late 2019 after a year-long investigation CNN reported that the Salesian order shifted around pedophile priests from the then Salesian High School for decades and pressured and intimidated victims.

Notable alumni 
 Jahvid Best, Olympic athlete, NFL player
 Jabari Bird, NBA player
 Jabari Brown, NBA player
 Russ Critchfield, professional basketball player
 Mike Dirnt, musician, songwriter, and singer (transferred to Pinole Valley High School)
 Kamil Loud, professional football player
 Rick Stuart, radio disc jockey
 Gene Taylor, professional football player
 Cecilia Vega, ABC White House correspondent

References

External links 
 

Buildings and structures in Richmond, California
Education in Richmond, California
High schools in Contra Costa County, California
Catholic preparatory schools in California
Catholic secondary schools in California
Salesian secondary schools
Roman Catholic Diocese of Oakland
Educational institutions established in 1927
1927 establishments in California